Djingarey Mamoudou (born 1964) is a Nigerien boxer. He competed in the men's featherweight event at the 1988 Summer Olympics.

References

External links
 

1964 births
Living people
Nigerien male boxers
Olympic boxers of Niger
Boxers at the 1988 Summer Olympics
Place of birth missing (living people)
Featherweight boxers